Members of the New South Wales Legislative Assembly who served in the 51st parliament held their seats from 1995 to 1999. They were elected at the 1995 state election, and at by-elections. The Speaker was John Murray.

See also
First Carr ministry
Second Carr ministry
Results of the 1995 New South Wales state election (Legislative Assembly)
Candidates of the 1995 New South Wales state election

References

Members of New South Wales parliaments by term
20th-century Australian politicians